This is a list of films which placed number-one at the South Korean box office during 2013.

Highest-grossing films

References

 Lists of South Korean films
 

South Korea
2013
Box